Margherita Zalaffi (born 7 April 1966) is an Italian former fencer. She won a gold medal in the women's team foil event at the 1992 Summer Olympics and silvers at the same event in 1988 and in the women's team épée in 1996. She competed at five consecutive Olympic Games from 1984 to 2000.

See also
 List of athletes with the most appearances at Olympic Games

References

External links
 

1966 births
Living people
Italian female fencers
Olympic fencers of Italy
Fencers at the 1984 Summer Olympics
Fencers at the 1988 Summer Olympics
Fencers at the 1992 Summer Olympics
Fencers at the 1996 Summer Olympics
Fencers at the 2000 Summer Olympics
Olympic gold medalists for Italy
Olympic silver medalists for Italy
Olympic medalists in fencing
Sportspeople from Siena
Medalists at the 1988 Summer Olympics
Medalists at the 1992 Summer Olympics
Medalists at the 1996 Summer Olympics
Universiade medalists in fencing
Universiade bronze medalists for Italy
Medalists at the 1991 Summer Universiade
Medalists at the 1993 Summer Universiade
20th-century Italian women
21st-century Italian women